Urban Emotions is the eighth studio album by Hins Cheung, released on July 11, 2008. The album features new versions of the duet, "Hate that I Love You", with international star Rihanna. Rihanna's original vocals remain unchanged from the original version, with Cheung replacing Ne-Yo's vocals in Cantonese and Mandarin.

Track listing

 他的故事 (His Story)
 願望樹上 (Above the wishing tree)
 櫻花樹下 (Under the Sakura)
 隱形人 (Invisible Man)
 狐 (Alone)
 夜宴 (Banquet)
 酩酊天使 (Cruel Angel)
 鬧鬼愛情 (Haunted Love)
 不吐不快 (Rave)
 雪花抄 (Snow Flakes)
 Déjà vu
 Hate That I Love You [Cantonese] - Rihanna & 張敬軒
 Hate That I Love You [Mandarin] - Rihanna & 張敬軒
 吻得太逼真 [Mandarin] (The kiss is too real 'Ardently Love' Mandarin version)

External links
Album track listing & Packshot

2008 albums
Hins Cheung albums